New England is the debut album by the American rock band New England. The group was best known for the song "Don't Ever Wanna Lose Ya", which received heavy radio exposure on Album-oriented rock (AOR) stations and reached the US Top 40 in 1979. "Hello, Hello, Hello" also received some airplay.

The quartet formed in the Boston area and was discovered by manager Bill Aucoin, who also managed Kiss. Paul Stanley helped produce the debut album along with producer Mike Stone, best known for his work with Queen and Asia. Guitarist and vocalist John Fannon was the leader of the band.

The group had a live stint supporting the falling but still high-profile Kiss, but New England slid between the cracks of other Aucoin projects. The group's success stalled when their label Infinity Records was absorbed by its parent company, MCA Records.

The album was also issued on CD in 1998 by the US re-issue label Renaissance Records. The CD contains an un-marked bonus track, a different extended mix of "Don't Ever Wanna Lose Ya".

In February 2023 a remastered version, with six bounus track, was released on CD by Rock Candy Records.

Track listing

All songs written and arranged by John Fannon.

 "Hello, Hello, Hello" - 3:36
 "Don't Ever Wanna Lose Ya" - 5:22
 "P.U.N.K. (Puny Undernourished Kid)" - 3:24
 "Shall I Run Away" - 5:10
 "Alone Tonight" - 3:39
 "Nothing To Fear" - 5:04
 "Shoot" - 4:00
 "Turn Out The Light" - 3:26
 "The Last Show" - 3:51
 "Encore" - 3:12

Bonus track on 1998 reissue

  "Don't Ever Wanna Lose Ya" (extended mix) - 6:20

Bonus Tracks on Rock Candy 2023 reissue 

1. "Hello, Hello, Hello" (Live) 

2."Shoot" (Live)

3."PUNK (Puny Undernourished Kid)" (Live)

4."Shall I Run Away" (Live) 

5" Nothing To Fear" (Live)

6"Don't Ever Want To Lose Ya" (Live)

Personnel
New England
John Fannon - guitars, lead vocals
Jimmy Waldo - keyboards, backing vocals
Hirsh Gardner - drums, backing vocals, co-lead vocals on "Nothing to Fear"
Gary Shea - bass guitar

References

1979 debut albums
Albums produced by Mike Stone (record producer)